The Rattanakosindra class were a pair of ocean-going armoured gunboats built in the United Kingdom and operated by the Royal Thai Navy.

Design and development
The original order for the Rattanakosindra class   armoured gunboats was placed in 1914 by the Kingdom of Siam. The original design for two ships, armed with four  guns, four  guns. The ships would powered by Vertical Triple Expansion engines and coal fired boilers. Armstrong Whitworth in High Walker, Newcastle upon Tyne was awarded the contract and the first ship was laid down 1914 in Yard 872 while Hawthorn Leslie was subcontracted to build the engines and boilers. The order was cancelled as a result of the First World War, the incomplete hull of HTMS Rattanakosindra was dismantled to free the slipway for British use and the second ship, HTMS Sukhothai was never laid down. Rattankosindra was reordered again in the 1920s from Armstrong Whitworth, losing a pair of guns in the process.

Ships

The new ships would retain the names of the cancelled pair of gunboats, HTMS Rattanakosindra (ร.ล.รัตนโกสินทร์) and HTMS Sukhothai (ร.ล.สุโขทัย), and be known as the Rattanakosindra class, but built to modified specifications with improved seaworthiness and reduced armament. The vessels, although classified as gunboats were built with a low-freeboard monitor-style layout compared to a traditional gunboat designs which generally lacked many of the features in the Rattanakosindra classs design. These were fully enclosed armoured turrets at the fore and aft, a conning tower and a fire-control system (a  rangefinder on the foremast). The vessel was short and broad beamed which contributed to a 'cramped' appearance. A tall monitor-style superstructure was given for improved visibility while firing. An unusual features of the Rattanakosindra class for a monitor-style warship was a raised-forecastle for improved seaworthiness. Four  guns in the original design was reduced to two single guns which were housed in fully enclosed turrets. The original anti-aircraft armament of four single high angle  guns was retained. Instead of the original cylindrical coal-fired Scotch marine boiler, oil-fired Yarrow boilers were used to power the ships twin vertical triple expansion engines.

Initially only Rattanakosindra was ordered in 1924. She was laid down first on 29 September of the same year by Armstrong in Elswick and completed August 1925. Sukhothai was ordered separately to the same specifications as the Rattanakosindra in 1928 and was laid down at Barrow-in-Furness in December 1918. This was ordered from the new Vickers-Armstrongs company, which was created by the merger of Armstrong Whitworth and rival Vickers Limited in the previous year. At the time of her launch, Sukhothai was romanised in English as Sukhodaya.

Service

The two gunboats were in active service during the Franco-Thai War and World War II and received additional anti-aircraft armament in the form of two single  QF 2-pounder naval guns in the 1930s and two single   Breda 20/65 mod.39 in the 1940s each, but neither Rattanakosindra nor Sukhothai saw combat. Sukkhotai was briefly involved in the Manhattan Rebellion of 1951 where she threatened to open fire on Klai Kangwon Palace. Both ships were stricken after decades of service, Rattanakosindra was retired in 1967 and Sukhothai was retired in 1971. The bow garuda of both ships are on display at the Royal Thai Navy Museum.

See also
 , identically named class from the 1980s

References

External links
Britishpathe.com

Ships of the Royal Thai Navy
Gunboat classes